Eiko Hirashima (born 7 October 1950) is a Japanese gymnast. She competed at the 1972 Summer Olympics.

References

External links
 

1950 births
Living people
Japanese female artistic gymnasts
Olympic gymnasts of Japan
Gymnasts at the 1972 Summer Olympics
Place of birth missing (living people)
20th-century Japanese women